An Nhơn is a district-level town of Bình Định Province in the South Central Coast region of Vietnam. As of 2003 the district had a population of 187,737. The district covers an area of 255 km². The district capital is Bình Định. It has a population density of 779 people per km², and they are distributed unevenly, with high concentrations in the wards of Bình Định and Đập Đá. 55.50% of the population in the district are of working age.

An Nhơn district lies on a plain at 13°49'N and 109°18'E. It is located along the National Route 1 20 km from the city of Quy Nhơn. The north of the district borders Phù Cát, the east of the district borders Tuy Phước, the west borders Tây Sơn, and the south-west borders the mountainous district of Vân Canh.

Administrative divisions
The district includes 10 communes and 5 wards:

Bình Định (ward) 
Đập Đá (ward)
Nhơn Thành (ward)
Nhơn Hưng (ward)
Nhơn Hòa (ward)
Nhơn Mỹ  
Nhơn Hạnh  
Nhơn Phong  
Nhơn Hậu  
Nhơn An 
Nhơn Phúc  
Nhơn Khánh  
Nhơn Lộc 
Nhơn Thọ  
Nhơn Tân

History
During the period 938-1470, An Nhơn was in the heartland of the Champa kingdom, with the capital at Đồ Bàn (now in Nhơn Hậu). In 1470, An Nhơn was in Tuy Viễn district. In 1602, Nguyễn Hoàng changed the name from Hoài Nhơn to Quy Nhơn. In 1778, the Tây Sơn dynasty settled and developed An Nhơn into the emperor's fortress. In May 1799, after accounting for the stronghold, Nguyễn Ánh changed its name to Bình Định. In 1832, Minh Mạng created the district of An Nhơn in its current form.

References

Districts of Bình Định province
County-level towns in Vietnam
Populated places in Bình Định province